Peter Vogel may refer to:

 Peter Vogel (actor) (1937–1978), German actor, appeared in Holocaust miniseries
 Peter Vogel (cyclist) (born 1939), Swiss cyclist
 Peter Vogel (footballer) (born 1952), German footballer
 Peter Vogel (banker) (born 1954), Polish murderer and later banker
 Peter Vogel (computer designer) (born 1954), Australian computer designer of Fairlight CMI
 Peter Vogel (artist) (1937–2017), German sound artist

See also 
 Peter Vogelzang (born 1945), Dutch businessman